Nuevo Emperador is a town and corregimiento in Arraiján District, Panamá Oeste Province, Panama with a population of 3,903 as of 2010. Its population as of 1990 was 2,319; its population as of 2000 was 2,765.

References

Corregimientos of Panamá Oeste Province